A double-deck aircraft has two decks for passengers; the second deck may be only a partial deck, and may be above or below the main deck. Most commercial aircraft have one passenger deck and one cargo deck for luggage and ULD containers, but only a few have two decks for passengers, typically above or below a third deck for cargo.

History 

Many early flying boat airliners, such as the Boeing 314 Clipper and Short Sandringham, had two decks. Following World War II the Stratocruiser, a partially double-decked derivative of the B-29 Superfortress, became popular with airlines around the world.

The first full double-deck aircraft was the French Breguet Deux-Ponts, in service from 1953. The first partial double-deck jet airliner was the widebody Boeing 747, in service from 1970, with the top deck smaller than the main deck. Boeing originally designed the distinctive 747 bubble top with air cargo usage in mind. The small top deck permitted the cockpit and a few passengers and nose doors with unobstructed access to the full length of the hold. Most 747s are passenger jets, and a small percentage are cargo jets with nose doors.

The first full double-deck jet airliner is the Airbus A380, which has two passenger decks extending the full length of the fuselage, as well as a full-length lower third deck for cargo. It entered regular service in late-October 2007.

List of double-deck aircraft

Double-deck flying boats
 Latécoère 521/522
Martin M-130
Latécoère 631
Sud-Est SE.200 Amphitrite
Boeing 314 Clipper
 Dornier Do-X
 Short Sandringham
 Short Empire C-Class and the related G-class 
 Saunders-Roe Princess - did not enter service.

Partial second passenger deck

 Caproni Ca.48/58
 Extra seats on top of the passenger cabin.

 Airbus A330 and Airbus A340
 Optional lower deck lavatories and crew rest
 Boeing 377 Stratocruiser
Lower deck could be configured for lounge areas or additional seating

 Boeing 747
Partial upper deck lounge areas or seating
Optional upper deck crew rest and galleys
 Boeing 767
Optional lower level crew rest area sleeps six 
 Boeing 777
 Optional lower deck lavatories and galley
 Optional upper deck crew rest
 Junkers G.38
 Ilyushin Il-86
 Lower deck galley
 Lower deck "self loading luggage storage"
 Lockheed L-1011 Tristar
 Lower deck galley
 Lower deck lounge (Pacific Southwest Airlines) (LTU International)
 McDonnell Douglas DC-10
 Lower deck galleys
 Tupolev Tu-114
 Lower deck galleys.
 Lower deck aircrew rest area.

Full second passenger deck
 Breguet 761, 763 and 765
 Airbus A380

Cargo aircraft with a separate passenger deck
 Antonov An-225 Mriya
 Antonov An-124 Ruslan
 Lockheed C-5 Galaxy
 Boeing C-97 Stratofreighter
 Douglas C-124 Globemaster II
 Short Belfast
 Lockheed R6V Constitution
 Blackburn Beverley - military transport, the main deck could be used for cargo or troops

Double-deck cargo aircraft
 Aviation Traders Carvair
 Armstrong Whitworth AW.660 Argosy
 Bristol Freighter
 Convair XC-99
 Douglas C-124 Globemaster II

Cancel project double-deck passenger aircraft
 Bach Super Transport
 McDonnell Douglas MD-12
 Sukhoi KR-860
 Vickers VC-10 Superb: see

See also
 Large aircraft
Wide-body aircraft

References

 
Aircraft configurations